The R933 road is a regional road in Ireland which links the R161 regional road with the R154 regional road in Trim in County Meath.

See also 
 Roads in Ireland

References 

Regional roads in the Republic of Ireland
Roads in County Meath